Boronia grandisepala is a plant in the citrus family Rutaceae and is endemic to northern parts of the Northern Territory. It is an erect shrub with elliptic leaves and white, pink or burgundy-coloured, four-petalled flowers.

Description
Its branches and leaves are covered with star-like hairs. Flowering occurs from December to June.

Taxonomy and naming
Boronia grandisepala was first formally described in 1859 by Ferdinand von Mueller who published the description in  Fragmenta phytographiae Australiae. The specific epithet (grandisepala) is derived from the Latin words grandis meaning "large" and sepalum meaning "sepal", giving "large sepaled Boronia". 

In 1997, Marco Duretto described two subspecies in the journal Australian Systematic Botany and the names have been accepted by the Australian Plant Census:
The epithet acanthopida is a reference to Deaf Adder Falls - the death adder is a member of the snake genus Acanthophis, near where this subspecies is found.

Distribution and habitat
Subspecies grandisepala grows in heath and woodland from near Jim Jim Falls to the Nitmiluk National Park.

Conservation
This boronia is classed as of "least concern" under the Northern Territory Government Parks and Wildlife Conservation Act.

References 

grandisepala
Flora of the Northern Territory
Plants described in 1859
Taxa named by Ferdinand von Mueller